Face Facts is a 1980 album from glam rock band T. Roth and Another Pretty Face. Bon Jovi drummer Tico Torres plays on the album.

T. Roth and Another Pretty Face recorded the album in the late 1970s with future Ramones producer Ed Stasium.

The band recorded their first album in 1974 entitled 21st Century Rock, also produced by Ed Stasium, and RCA did not release it and shelved the album.

Track listing

References

External links
Face Facts at iTunes
21st Century Rock at iTunes

1980 albums
Glam rock albums by American artists
T. Roth and Another Pretty Face albums
albums produced by Ed Stasium